There are three castles named the , in Japan.
Takiyama Castle (Tokyo), Hachiōji, Tokyo.
, Kōbe, Hyōgo.
, Okazaki, Aichi.